Phospholipase A2, membrane associated is an enzyme that in humans is encoded by the PLA2G2A gene.

See also
Phospholipase A2

References

Further reading